Shannon Price Minter (born February 14, 1961) is an American civil rights attorney and the legal director of the National Center for Lesbian Rights in San Francisco.

Early life and education
Minter is a 1993 graduate of Cornell Law School and he has been lead counsel in dozens of groundbreaking legal victories for the LGBT community. Raised in East Texas, Minter began transitioning at age 35. Minter did not change his birth name after he started living as a trans man.

Career
Minter first gained national attention in the United States in 2001 representing the lesbian partner of Diane Whipple, in a wrongful death case due to a dog mauling, which resulted in a landmark decision in California that extended tort claims to same-sex domestic partners; previously it was a right limited only to married couples. Marjorie Knoller was sentenced to serve 15 years to life for the death of Diane Whipple. Whipple's partner, Sharon Smith, succeeded in suing for $1,500,000 in civil damages, which she donated to Saint Mary's College of California to fund the women's lacrosse team.

In 2003, Minter gained national attention again when CourtTV aired the entire case of Kantaras v. Kantaras, where Minter represented Michael Kantaras, a transgender man who was trying to keep custody of his children. Though he won that case in 2002, it was reversed on appeal in 2004 by the Florida Supreme Court, upholding the claim that the marriage was null and void because her ex-husband was still a woman and same-sex marriages are illegal in Florida. The couple settled the case with joint custody in 2005.

In 2009 Minter was the lead attorney arguing before the California Supreme Court to overturn California Proposition 8. Ken Starr represented the opposing side on this case. Ruling that California's citizens held the inalienable right to amend their constitution, the 5 for 4 majority upheld Prop 8's ban on same-sex marriages though they agreed to recognize marriages that had already taken place under a "grandfather clause". Ultimately the entire statute was rendered moot after the Supreme Court ruled that all states must recognize gay marriage in 2015. 

Minter has taught law at UCLA School of Law, Stanford University, Golden Gate University and Santa Clara University.

Awards
Minter won a Ford Foundation "Leadership for a Changing World" award in October 2005.

Personal life
Minter got married in 2001 and has a daughter. He said at the time that he was pained "by the injustice" that transgender people could legally marry in California while gay and lesbian couples could not.

References

External links

Living people
LGBT people from Texas
Transgender men
1961 births
Law in the San Francisco Bay Area
Lawyers from San Francisco
Activists from the San Francisco Bay Area
Cornell Law School alumni
Golden Gate University faculty
LGBT lawyers
Transgender academics
Transgender studies academics